Bannockburn RFC is a rugby union club in the Scottish Rugby Union, playing in the . The team is based in Bannockburn, near Stirling in central Scotland.

History 
Bannockburn Rugby Club was started by former pupils from St Modan's High School in Stirling. Playing under the banner of St Modans FPs until the name was changed in 1996 to Bannockburn Rugby Club.

The club play their home matches at the Bluebellwood Clubhouse in Bannockburn with one senior XV side, as well as a mini/midi setup.

The club played their first match in 1979 against HMS Neptune and entered the Midland league in 1980 until they joined the Glasgow set up in 1982 where they stayed until 1994 before rejoining the Midlands set up.

In the 2000–01 season the club reached the heady heights of the National leagues for the first time in their history. 

The club has produced some players who have since gone onto greater things with other clubs, namely Newcastle Prop George Graham and Scotland B player Eddie Pollock.

The club has firmly committed to youth players, forging links with local schools whilst operating the thriving junior set up aimed at bringing through players of the future from the local area and beyond. Bannockburn Rugby Club are founding members of the Forth Valley Association of Rugby Clubs.

2020 saw the relaunch of the club's seconds and social side, the Beavers.

In 2021, Bannockburn Rugby Club launched their very first women's side, the Bannockburn Valkyries.

External links 
 Bannockburn Rugby Club website

References 

www.bannockburnrugby.co.uk

Scottish rugby union teams
Sport in Stirling (council area)
Rugby clubs established in 1978
1978 establishments in Scotland